Anatoly Tishchenko (born 18 July 1970, in Taganrog) is a Russian sprint canoer who competed from 1989 to 2004. Competing in four Summer Olympics, he won a bronze in the K-4 1000 m event at Atlanta in 1996.

Tishchenko also won a total of fifteen medals at the ICF Canoe Sprint World Championships with seven golds (K-2 500 m: 1990, K-4 200 m: 1994, 1997; K-4 500 m: 1993, 1994, 1995; K-4 1000 m: 1994), four silvers (K-2 200 m: 1998, K-2 500 m: 1989, K-4 200 m: 1995, K-4 1000 m: 1990), and four bronzes (K-4 200 m: 1999, K-4 500 m: 2003, K-4 1000 m: 1993, 1998).

References

1970 births
Canoeists at the 1992 Summer Olympics
Canoeists at the 1996 Summer Olympics
Canoeists at the 2000 Summer Olympics
Canoeists at the 2004 Summer Olympics
Living people
Olympic canoeists of Russia
Olympic canoeists of the Unified Team
Olympic bronze medalists for Russia
Russian male canoeists
Soviet male canoeists
Sportspeople from Taganrog
Olympic medalists in canoeing
ICF Canoe Sprint World Championships medalists in kayak
Medalists at the 1996 Summer Olympics